Suraiya Azmin (born 29 May 1999) is a Bangladeshi cricketer who plays as a right-arm medium bowler. She made her Women's One Day International cricket (WODI) debut against South Africa in the 2017 Women's Cricket World Cup Qualifier on 10 February 2017. In January 2022, she was named in Bangladesh's team for the 2022 Commonwealth Games Cricket Qualifier tournament in Malaysia. She made her Women's Twenty20 International (WT20I) debut on 18 January 2022, for Bangladesh against Malaysia in the qualifier tournament. Later the same month, she was named in Bangladesh's team for the 2022 Women's Cricket World Cup in New Zealand.

References

External links
 
 

1999 births
Living people
People from Joypurhat District
Bangladeshi women cricketers
Bangladesh women One Day International cricketers
Bangladesh women Twenty20 International cricketers
Chittagong Division women cricketers